Currituck may refer to:

 Currituck County, North Carolina, its category, and nearby features:
 Currituck Beach Light, a lighthouse in Corolla, North Carolina, on the Outer Banks.
 Currituck County Airport, IATA (ICAO) codes: ONX (KONX)
 Currituck County High School in Barco, North Carolina 
 Currituck, North Carolina, the unincorporated county seat (originally called Currituck Court House)
 Currituck Sound, an inlet of the Atlantic Ocean in northeastern part of North Carolina.
 Places in the List of Registered Historic Places in North Carolina:
Currituck County Courthouse and Jail
Currituck Shooting Club
 Currituck Township in Hyde County, North Carolina
 Ships with the name USS Currituck:
 USS Currituck (1862), a Civil War screw steamer originally named Seneca
 USS Currituck (AV-7), a World War II and Cold War seaplane tender nicknamed the Wild Goose
 Other s
 The dredge ship Currituck, used by the U.S. Army Corps of Engineers
 Currituck Island  in Antarctica's Highjump Archipelago, so named by Navy Operation Highjump personnel operating from the Currituck .
 a Microsoft code name for their Team Foundation Work Item Tracking product